The 2015 Vanier Cup, the 51st edition of the Canadian university football championship took place on Saturday, November 28, 2015 at Telus Stadium in Quebec City, Quebec. It was the fourth time that the city of Quebec has hosted the Vanier Cup. For the third consecutive year the championship game was played in the province of Quebec. The game featured the Canada West Champion UBC Thunderbirds and the RSEQ Champion Montreal Carabins. This was the second appearance for the Carabins and the sixth for the Thunderbirds.

Semi-Championships 
The Vanier Cup is played between the champions of the Mitchell Bowl and the Uteck Bowl, the national semi-final games. In 2015, according to the rotating schedule, the Canada West Hardy Trophy championship team visited the Atlantic conference's Loney Bowl championship team for the Uteck Bowl. The winners of the Québec conference Dunsmore Cup visited the Yates Cup Ontario championship team for the Mitchell Bowl.

Scoring summary
First Quarter
UBC - van Gylswyk 45 yd field goal (12:44)
UBC - van Gylswyk 33 yd field goal (07:46)

Second Quarter
UBC - Davis 6 yd touchdown and converted (13:51)
UBC - van Gylswyk 43 yd field goal (06:21)
MON - Paquet 12 yd touchdown and converted (02:59)
MON - Deschamps 15 yd field goal (00:00)

Third Quarter
UBC - Deschamps 44 yd touchdown and converted (09:23)
MON - Deschamps 22 yd field goal (04:11)
MON - Deschamps 12 yd field goal (00:12)

Fourth Quarter
MON - Nadeau-Piuze 6 yd touchdown and converted (07:45)
UBC - van Gylswyk 20 yd field goal (00:00)

Playoff bracket 

The seed of the OUA Semi-Final is done so that the first-place team play the weakest team still alive.

References

External links
 Official website

Vanier Cup
Vanier Cup
Vanier Cup
2015 in Quebec
Canadian football competitions in Quebec
2010s in Quebec City